Kala (കള) is a 2021 Indian Malayalam-language pschyological action film, directed by Rohith V. S. and written by Yadhu Pushpakaran and Rohith V. S. It stars Tovino Thomas and Sumesh Moor in the lead roles and features Lal Paul and Divya Pillai in supporting roles. Chaman Chakko is the editor of the film while Akhil George handles the cinematography. Dawn Vincent composes the background score and did the audiography. The film is produced by Siju Mathew and Navis Xaviour under Juvis Productions and co-produced by Tovino Thomas, Rohith V. S. and Akhil George under Adventure Company and Tovino Thomas Productions.

Plot
Shaji is living in an isolated farmhouse with his wife Vidya Shaji, his young son and his Cane Corso black dog. He is in debts, due to the failure of his farming, and his father Raveendran, who had entrusted him to take care of the farming, has lost hope in him and is now considering him as completely useless and scolds him often. To manage the work in the farmland and to steal some of his father's peppercorns to clear his debt, Shaji hires a few Tamil workers through an acquaintance. Along with her brother, Vidya visits her parents' place to take off from her routine life for a while. As the workers begin working, an eerie atmosphere creeps in. 

Shaji spots one of the worker boys spying on him and catches him. He learns that on a previous encounter, he had killed the boy's beloved dog without his knowledge, and the boy has now returned to avenge his loss. It is also revealed that all of the Tamil workers were once owners of the farmland. The land was then forcefully taken over by Raveendran. Shaji requests the boy to forget the incident and offers to buy him a new dog, but the boy is determined to seek revenge and swears to kill Shaji's dog. Shaji loses his temper and a fearsome fight ensues between both of them fighting for survival and vengeance.

When it starts raining, Shaji realizes that he has to shift peppercorn, where he locks the boy in a room and rushes dripping in blood. He unloads the peppercorn sacks outside the storage shed. When he returns to the room, he finds the boy missing. He gets furious when he sees the boy setting the peppercorn in a fire. They continue fighting where the boy easily gets the upper hand and makes Shaji run for his life. Finally, the boy makes Shaji feel the pain of his loss and is satisfied to have achieved his vengeance successfully. After this, the boy walks away with Shaji's dog happily.

Cast
 Tovino Thomas as Shaji (antagonist)
 Sumesh Moor as protagonist
 Divya Pillai as Vidya Shaji
 Lal as Raveendran
 Pramod Velliyanad as Mani Ashan
 Sreejith Ravi as Stephen, Shaji's Friend 
 Bibin Perumbillikunnel as Anil

Production
On 11 July 2020, Tovino Thomas announced that his next project titled Kala. The pooja function of the film was done on 5 September 2020 and the principal photography began on September 7. On 7 October 2020, Tovino was hospitalized after getting injured while filming an action sequence at Kolenchery. The filming resumes on 18 December 2020 after he recovered from the injuries. The filming completed on 30 December 2020.

Music

The title track of the film Vanyam, penned by Vinayak Sasikumar and composed by Dawn Vincent, was released on 27 March 2021 on Juvis Production's YouTube channel.

Release

Theatrical
Kala was released theatrically on 25 March 2021.

Home media
Kala started streaming on Amazon Prime Video and Saina Play from 24 May 2021.
Tamil version of the film titled Kala started streaming on Aha Tamil platform from 4 June 2021.

Reception

Critical response
The film received positive reviews from critics and audience. 

Vaisakh Vamadevan from The Update rated film 3 out of 5 and stated that "Kala offers a new visual experience, where technical sides was at top notch"  Baradwaj Rangan of Film Companion wrote "Kala is beautifully made. This is a very stylized film and the sound design by Dawn Vincent complements that beautifully. Action choreography is another major highlight as well as Akhil George's cinematography which alternates between stillness and action."

References

External links
 
2020s Malayalam-language films
2021 films
2021 psychological thriller films
Indian psychological thriller films
Indian films about revenge
Indian action thriller films
Films shot in Kochi